The White Lion is a public house in Barthomley, Cheshire, England, just off junction 16 of the M6.  It was built in 1614, and is recorded in the National Heritage List for England as a designated Grade II* listed building.

It is on the Campaign for Real Ale's National Inventory of Historic Pub Interiors. Its thatched roof was damaged by a fire in 2013, but it re-opened later that year.

See also

Grade II* listed buildings in Cheshire East
Listed buildings in Barthomley

References

Further reading

External links

Grade II* listed pubs in Cheshire
National Inventory Pubs
Thatched buildings in England